Nicolae Tilihoi (9 December 1956 – 25 March 2018) was a Romanian professional footballer who played as a defender. 

He spent most of his career with Universitatea Craiova, where he was an indispensable member of the golden generation known as Craiova Maxima. Tilihoi was often nicknamed "the Iron Defender of Craiova". 

After retirement, Tilihoi coached several club teams, such as Metalul Bocșa, Jiul Craiova, Electroputere Craiova, Chimia Râmnicu Vâlcea, Callatis Mangalia and Drobeta-Turnu Severin.

International career
Tilihoi made nine appearances for the Romania senior team between 1979 and 1981.

Death
Tilihoi died early in the morning of 25 March 2018, at the age of 61, after struggling for several years with an incurable disease. He was buried two days later in Craiova.

Honours

Player	
Universitatea Craiova
Diviza A: 1979–80, 1980–81	
Cupa României: 1976–77, 1977–78, 1980–81, 1982–83

Notes

References

External links
 
 

1956 births
2018 deaths
Sportspeople from Brăila
Romanian footballers
Olympic footballers of Romania
Association football defenders
Liga I players
Liga II players
AFC Dacia Unirea Brăila players
CS Universitatea Craiova players
Romania international footballers
Romanian football managers